Union Sportive Sainte Anne Vertou is a French association football team founded in 1944. They play at the Stade Vincent et Robert Girard in Vertou, Loire-Atlantique and they currently compete in the National 3.

External links
USSA Vertou official website 

Football clubs in France
Association football clubs established in 1944
1944 establishments in France
Football clubs in Loire-Atlantique